Smerinthus saliceti, the Salicet sphinx, is a moth of the family Sphingidae. The species was first described by Jean Baptiste Boisduval in 1875.

Distribution 
It is found in valleys and along streamsides from Mexico City north to western Texas, southern Arizona and extreme southern California.

Description 
The wingspan is 67–89 mm. The forewing outer margin is wavy and the upperside of the forewing is gray brown with distinct dark and light bands. The upperside of the hindwing is mostly red with a yellow tanned outer margin and a blue spot which is usually divided by a V-shaped black line.

Biology 
Adults are on wing from April to September, probably in two generations.

The larvae feed on Salix and Populus species. There are two color morphs, pale green and lime green.

References

External links
Salicet Sphinx Moths of America

Smerinthus
Moths of North America
Moths of Central America
Fauna of the Colorado Desert
Fauna of the Sonoran Desert
Moths described in 1875